Negative is the 1999 debut studio album from influential Serbian rock band Negative. The album was an immediate success, and it included some of the band's greatest hits. Ja bih te sanjala became their signature song. During the next three years, the band had a string of successful singles such as "Ja bih te sanjala", "Oblaci", "Svet tuge", "Ti me ne volis" and "Vreme je". Videos were shot for all the singles from the album.

In May 2000, the band had their first live act in front of several thousand people. The concert was recorded and released on a CD later that year.

Track listing

External links
 Negative Official Page (Serbian and English)
 On: www.discogs.com

Negative (Serbian band) albums
1999 debut albums